Zimovia may refer to:

Zimovia Highway
Zimovia Strait